Venice is a census-designated place in Douglas County, Nebraska, United States. The population was 75 at the 2020 Census. 40 people are male and 35 are female. The area is 0.60 sq. miles. The population density is 125.09 people/sq. mi. The land area is 0.48 sq. miles. The water area is 0.12 sq. miles.

Demographics

References

Census-designated places in Douglas County, Nebraska
Census-designated places in Nebraska